Ali Rahim is an architect living in the United States. He is a full professor of architecture at the University of Pennsylvania School of Design (PennDesign), and  the founding director of the firm Contemporary Architecture Practice  in New York City.

Education 

Rahim graduated from the Rugby School in Great Britain, received  his bachelor's degree from the University of Michigan. and  his Master of Architecture from Columbia University in  New York, where he  was awarded the Honor Award for Excellence in Design and the Kinney Travelling Fellowship for his work.

Academic career
At the University of Pennsylvania, he coordinates the final year curriculum of the design studios for the Master of Architecture program at PennDesign. He has also taught as the Louis I. Kahn Visiting Professor at Yale University School of Architecture, as Zaha Hadid visiting studio professor at the University of Applied Arts (Die Angewandte Kunst) in  Vienna, Austria, as  visiting professor at the Harvard University Graduate School of Design, and as  visiting assistant professor at the University of Michigan College of Architecture and Urban Planning

Works

His work has used design research as a method to develop new techniques for architectural creation that leverage digital resources in design and production.

His work at Contemporary Architecture Practice has spanned from product design, to master planning.

His work has been exhibited at the MOMA in New York  and the Serpentine Gallery in London. It  has been published in Architectural Design,  Architectural Record, The New York Times, Harvard Design Magazine, and the Nikkei newspaper.

References

External links 

CAP website: http://www.c-a-p.net
PennDesign Biography: https://web.archive.org/web/20100726002047/http://www.design.upenn.edu/people/rahim_ali?destination=people%3Fpage%3D2%2526filter1%3D19
Interview with Ali Rahim: https://web.archive.org/web/20140527213620/http://www.whatisarchitecture.cc/2014/05/ali-rahim.html
 

Year of birth missing (living people)
Place of birth missing (living people)
Living people
American architects
Taubman College of Architecture and Urban Planning alumni
Columbia Graduate School of Architecture, Planning and Preservation alumni
University of Pennsylvania faculty
People educated at Rugby School
20th-century American architects
British emigrants to the United States